Melrose is the oldest town in the Flinders Ranges, South Australia. The town was once named "Mount Remarkable". At the 2016 Australian census, Melrose had a population of 347.

The town is known for its proximity to Mount Remarkable and the surrounding National Park, its caravan park and historical sites including Jacka's brewery and Melrose Courthouse.

History
Journalist Rodney Cockburn, in his popular book What's in a Name asserts that consensus has not yet been reached about the origins of Melrose's name. He gives the explanation that its surveyor named the town after George Melrose, of Rosebank, Mount Pleasant, who assisted him when he was ill.
Another explanation suggests a land owner named Alexander Campbell settled in the area in 1844 with his family and named the region after his hometown, Melrose, in Scotland.
Townsites were surveyed at either end, Melrose to the north and Bangor at the southern end. This was in accord with Cockburn's findings, but Manning was convinced that A. L. Elder, a prominent director of the company and a proud Scotsman, named it for Melrose in Roxburghshire.

The first European explorer in the area was Edward John Eyre in 1840; pastoralists settled in the area about a decade later. Copper was discovered and mining started in 1846, but it was not economically viable, and ceased in 1851. The mine was opened again three more times, with the latest closure in 1917.

In 1893 at a time of high unemployment, Wilton Hack founded a communal settlement in the area. At its peak, some 130 settlers were working  of land. By the end of 1895 after a succession of poor seasons around half the settlers had left, and in 1896 the village was closed by the Government.

When it was opened in 1848, the police station in Melrose was not only the first permanent police station in the region, but the base of the largest police district in the world. A constable, two troopers and an Aboriginal tracker were responsible for an area extending to the Timor Sea.

The Wilmington railway line from Gladstone opened near Melrose in 1915 and closed in 1990. Melrose is also on the Horrocks Highway, formerly known as Main North Road.

Heritage listings

Melrose has a number of heritage-listed sites, including:

 3 Brewery Street: Keating Cottage
 Melrose to Orroroo Road: Mount Remarkable Woolshed
 Melrose to Orroroo Road: Mount Remarkable Station
 Mount Street: Jacka's Brewery and Yard Walls
 near Melrose: Rankine's Hut
 Lot 2 Spratt Street: Timber Slab Dwelling
 Stuart Street: Melrose Post Office
 Stuart Street: Melrose Courthouse and Police Station
 Stuart Street: Mount Remarkable Inn
 22-24 Stuart Street: Blacksmith Shop and Dwelling
 13 Whitby Street: Timber Slab Dwelling

Jacka's Brewery
Jacka's Brewery was a family business founded by Joseph Jacka in 1877 in Melrose. Several months prior, Joseph and his brother William had leased the land the brewery still resides upon from Joseph's father-in-law. At the time, the Jacka family also owned the North Star Hotel in Melrose, and were already experienced brewers as they had previously owned a brewery in Auburn.

In 1887 Joseph continued brewing in Melrose while his brother William relocated to Burra. Jacka's brewery was a great success and popular amongst the locals. Within the next decade or so, Joseph was able to buy more surrounding land and extend the breweries premises. At this point, Jacka's brewery was distributing beer to Port Pirie and Port Augusta using custom made wagons, wooden casks and teams of eight horses to traverse the Flinders Ranges. William returned to Jacka's Brewery in 1901 after his brother died, to assist his nephew William J.S. Jacka with running the business. The brewery ceased production in 1934 after World War I and the Great Depression rendered it economically inviable.

The brewery was formerly known as T.B. Marshall's Flour Mill.

Melrose Cemetery
Melrose Cemetery was established in the 1860s. According to the Virtual War Memorial for Australia, the opening of the cemetery is referenced by local newspapers. This includes the South Australian Register'''s account of a whooping cough epidemic creating several new graves mere months after the cemetery's opening in 1863. Almost a decade later, the South Australian Register again referred to Melrose Cemetery as being "new", as well as a "regular resort for pigs to go about rooting in", suggesting that the council take better care of the grounds.

 Indigenous population 

 Nukunu 
As of 1974, there are records of the Ngaiawang Indigenous Tribe, also referred to as the Nukunu, being located east of Melrose and Mount Remarkable. The term 'Nukunu' may have been based on the term 'Nokunno' used by the Kaurna tribe, and may refer to a metaphorical assassin that hunts at night. Variations of the name include but are not limited to: Wongaidja, Nukuna, Nookoona, and Nuguna. Furthermore, according to Tiechelmann and Schürmann's 1840 account of the tribe, the Nukunu also practiced both subincision and circumcision as male initiation rites. Efforts are currently being made to revive the Nukunu language.

The presence and influence of the Nukunu people in Melrose is evident in place names. An example of this is the property of 'Bartagunyah', which, according to the Bartagunyah Estate website, means 'home of the Bardi Grubs'. 

 Adnyamathanha 
Additionally, the Adnyamathanha people lived in the northern Flinders Ranges area for many millennia.

 Tourism and landmarks 
Today, Melrose is the base for visitors to the Mount Remarkable National Park and a centre for the local farmers.

Melrose Tennis Club hosts a tennis tournament over the Easter weekend, with finals played on Monday morning. The tournament usually attracts around 200 participants across all the events.

In June, Melrose is home to the Fat Tyre Festival'', an off-road bike celebration exploring local bike trails and crowding parades of freak bikes.

In August, Melrose is also home to the King of the Mount trail race. This is a race to the summit of Mt Remarkable, during which runners and walkers ascend over  along a  trail.

Melrose is home to a caravan park visited by 100,000 tourists every year.

The town also has several sites and associated activities that are popular tourist attractions throughout the year.

Paradise Square
Paradise Square was the first cemetery in Melrose, situated by the Melrose Heritage Centre. According to the Virtual War Memorial for Australia, almost 128 burials took place in Paradise Square until its closure in the 1850s and prior to the establishment of Melrose Cemetery. Several Paradise Square burials were eventually relocated to the new Melrose Cemetery.

In 1890 on Arbor Day, 70 trees were planted on the grounds previously occupied by Paradise Square. The trees were replaced by tennis courts in 1925, which were later removed. Today, gardens provide a tribute to the remaining residents of Paradise Square.

Bartagunyah Winery and Estate
Bartagunyah Estate and Winery is located approximately 5 km from Melrose. Its close proximity to the town means the winery is considered one of Melrose's tourist attractions. The land the estate sits upon was originally named by the Nukunu people, an Indigenous Australian community native to the Melrose region. The name translates to 'home of the bardy grubs'. The property itself was originally used for livestock in the 1930s, but in 1997 it was converted to a vineyard and winery. Tourists can participate in wine tasting and several ecotourism activities, including but not limited to mountain biking across ridge top trials, camping with a view of the Willochra Plain, and 4WD tours.

Old Emu Foot
Old Emu Foot has been identified by arborists at the National Register of Big Trees as the largest tree in South Australia, more so for its width than its height. It has also been identified as the largest River Red Gum (Eucalyptus camaldulensis) in Australia. Its size was compared with several contenders throughout NSW, Victoria and Western Australia using the American Forests formula.

The tree was nominated as the largest River Red Gum in Australia and largest tree in South Australia by the director of Arbortech, Kym Knight. Knight has estimated the tree's age to be around 400 years.

Old Emu Foot is not considered a tourist attraction as it resides on private property and isn't easily accessible for the general public. It sits roughly 1.2 km from the Melrose Showgrounds in a sheep paddock owned by farmer David McCallum.

It is 35 metres tall, its circumference is 14.82 metres, and its crown is 29 metres. These dimensions afford Old Emu Foot a score of 722 points according to the American Forests formula.

Creek
On the West side of the Melrose Township, flows the Wilochra Creek heading Northwards. The creek is freshwater and is home to freshwater leeches, ducks, frogs and water insects. In some parts of the creek, depths can reach a maximum of two meters. Bike trails cross the creek several times and follow the creek adjacent to its course.

Education
Melrose has several educational institutions, including but not limited to: 
 Melrose primary school
 Melrose kindergarten
 Terka township
 Wilmington Primary School
 Wilmington Kindergarten
 Booleroo Centre District School

Notes and references

Further reading 
South Australian History – Melrose
Fat Trye Festival

External links
Melrose community website

Flinders Ranges
Towns in South Australia